Papular mucinosis of infancy is a skin condition caused by fibroblasts producing abnormally large amounts of mucopolysaccharides, characterized by skin-colored or translucent papules.

See also 
 Papular mucinosis
 List of cutaneous conditions

References 

Mucinoses